Typaldos D. children's choir is a Greek children's choir.

History
In 1980 Dimitris Typaldos created an orchestra of classical guitars composed by children aged (between 8 and 16 years old). It had a wide repertoire including Bach, Handel, Vivaldi, Mozart etc.

The thought and inner need to make guitars sing in a human voice and thus accompany works of great composers such as Mikis Theodorakis, Manos Hatzidakis etc., led him to the foundation of a choir which reached its peak in 1985 when 50 children played with their guitars and sang classic works and songs by Mikis Theodorakis as a dedication to his 60 years.

Awards
In 1990 the choir won the first prize at the International contest of children's choir in Portugal with the songs "Doxastikon" of M. Theodorakis and "the clown" of N. Mavroudis.

Followed a series of concerts of the maestro and his children: at the Herodium ancient theatre, at the  Athens Concert Hall "Megaron", and many concerts in Melbourne and Sydney in Australia.

Choirs of children
Greek choirs
Musical groups established in 1980